Ian Gelder  (born 3 June 1949) is a British actor. He is known for his numerous stage and screen roles, including Mr Dekker in Torchwood: Children of Earth and Kevan Lannister in Game of Thrones.

Career
Gelder appeared in the TV movie of Rumpole of the Bailey as Rumpole's university lecturer son. He has also played many other roles on stage and screen. His stage work includes The Low Road (2013). From May to July 2014 he performed as Marcus Andronicus, brother of Titus, in Lucy Bailey's revival of her original 2006 production of Titus Andronicus at Shakespeare's Globe Theatre.

He has appeared in television programmes such as Torchwood: Children of Earth in 2009, and Game of Thrones, 2011 as Mr Dekker and Kevan Lannister respectively. After an absence of three years, Gelder reprised his role in the HBO series Game of Thrones in Season 5 and Season 6 as Kevan Lannister. Gelder guest starred in 12 episodes of Game of Thrones. In 2019, he guest-starred as Librarian Scholar Charles in the BBC TV series His Dark Materials, based on the critically acclaimed book trilogy by Philip Pullman. Then in 2020, he guest-starred as Zellin in the seventh episode of the twelfth season of Doctor Who, "Can You Hear Me?".

Filmography

Films

TV
{| class="wikitable sortable"
|+ Television
! Year
! Title
! Role
! class="unsortable" style="width:20em;" | Notes
|-
|rowspan="2"|1972
|ITV Sunday Night Theatre 
|Unnamed role
|(TV Series), 1 episode: "Three Months Gone"
|-
|New Scotland Yard 
|Andrew Perks
|(TV Series), 1 episode: "A Case of Prejudice"
|-
|rowspan="2"|1973
|Murder Must Advertise 
|Hector Puncheon
|(TV Mini-Series), 1 episode: "Episode #1.3"
|-
|The Donati Conspiracy
|Dave Dent
|(TV Series), 3 episodes: "Episode #1.1", "Episode #1.2" and "Episode #1.3"
|-
|rowspan="2"|1974
|The Wide World of Mystery 
|Unnamed role
|(TV Series), 1 episode: "The Next Victim"
|-
|Edward the King 
|Affie / Prince Alfred
|(TV Mini-Series), 5 episodes
|-
|1975-1976
|Play for Today
|Andrew Patterson (1975) / Steve Riches (1976)
|(TV Series), 2 episodes: "The After Dinner Game" and "Packman's Barn"
|-
|1976
|Thriller
|Small
|(TV Series), 1 episode: "The Next Victim"
|-
|rowspan="2"|1978
|The Three Kisses 
|Lieutenant Arthur Raffleton
|(TV Movie)
|-
|Spearhead 
|Lieutenant Preece
|(TV Series), 1 episode: "Loyalties"
|-
|1979
|The Professionals
|King
|(TV Series), 1 episode: "The Purging of CI5"
|-
|1980
|Rumpole of the Bailey
|Nick Rumpole
|(TV Series), 1 episode: "Rumpole's Return"
|-
|1984
|I Thought You'd Gone
|Tony
|(TV Series), 7 episodes
|-
|1988
|London's Burning
|Negotiator
|(TV Series), 1 episode: "Episode #1.5"
|-
|1989
|Blackeyes 
|Rupert
|(TV Mini-Series), 1 episode: "Episode #1.3"
|-
|1991
|Van der Valk
|Basten
|(TV Series), 1 episode: "Dangerous Games"
|-
|1991-1998
|The Bill
|Hulse (1991)/ Maurice Cowans (1993)/ Mike Naylor (1994)/ Kenneth Grant (1998)
|(TV Series), 4 episodes
|-
|1992
|Ruth Rendell Mysteries 
|Peter Renton
|(TV Series), 1 episode: "An Unwanted Woman: Part Two"
|-
|1993
|Poirot
|Victor Astwell
|(TV Series), 1 episode: "The Underdog"
|-
|1993-2019
|Casualty
|Jeremy (1993)/ Guy Chambers (1997)/ Arthur Swain (2004)/ Stan Villiers (2019)
|(TV Series), 4 episodes
|-
|rowspan="3"|1994
|Chandler & Co 
|The Rev. Ewan Price
|(TV Series), 1 episode: "Those Who Trespass Against Us"
|-
|Screen Two
|Visitor
|(TV Series), 1 episode: "Skallagrigg"
|-
|The Day Today 
|Chanticlier Guardsley
|(TV Mini-Series), 1 episode: "Stretchcast"
|-
|rowspan="3"|1995
|Bugs 
|Vermeer
|(TV Series), 1 episode: "Hot Metal"
|-
|Fist of Fun 
|(TV Series), 4 episodes
|-
|Absolutely Fabulous
|David
|(TV Series), 1 episode: "Sex"
|-
|rowspan="2"|1997
|Kavanagh QC
|Dr. Clarke
|(TV Series), 1 episode: "Blood Money"
|-
|Brass Eye
|Dr. Jonathan Kwattes
|(TV Series), 1 episode: "Animals"
|-
|1998
|McCallum
|David Johnson
|(TV Series), 1 episode: "Harvest"
|-
|2001
|Hawkins
|Tregawn
|(TV Movie)
|-
|2004
|My Dad's the Prime Minister 
|Elf
|(TV Series), 1 episode: "Powerless"
|-
|rowspan="2"|2006
|Holby City
|Paul Galvin
|(TV Series), 1 episode: "It's Been a Long Day"
|-
|The Commander: Blacklight|John Carr
|(TV Movie)"
|-
|2007
|Fallen Angel 
|Canon Hinds
|(TV Mini-Series), 1 episode
|-
|rowspan="2"|2009
|Torchwood: Children of Earth|Mr Dekker 
|(TV Series), 5 episodes
|-
|Robin Hood|Archbishop Walter
|(TV Series), 1 episode: "The King Is Dead, Long Live the King"
|-
|2010
|Silent Witness|Dr Stanley Jacobs
|(TV Series), 1 episode: "Shadows: Part 1"
|-
|2011
|Psychoville|Butler
|(TV Series), 1 episode: "Hancock"
|-
|2011-2016
|Game of Thrones 
|Kevan Lannister
|(TV Series), 12 episodes
|-
|2012
|Endeavour|Stan Tremlett
|(TV Series), 1 episode: "Pilot"
|-
|2013
|Mr Selfridge|Waring
|(TV Series), 2 episodes: "Episode #1.1" and "Episode #1.2"
|-
|rowspan="2"|2016
|EastEnders|Dr. Adam Gorman
|(TV Series), 2 episodes: "Episode #1.5280" and "Episode #1.5281"
|-
|Ripper Street|Joseph Chamberlain
|(TV Series), 1 episode: "The Strangers' Home"
|-
|rowspan="3"|2017
|Queers|Jackie
|(TV Mini-Series), 1 episode: "I Miss the War"
|-
|Riviera|Druot the Solicitor
|(TV Series), 1 episode: "Faussaires / Counterfeiters"
|-
|Snatch|Norman Gordon
|(TV Series), 9 episodes
|-
|2018
|Lore 
|Aleister Crowley
|(TV Series documentary), 1 episode: "Jack Parsons: The Devil and the Divine"
|-
|2018-2020
|Doctor Who|Remnants (voice role) / Zellin (2020)
|(TV Series), 2 episodes: "The Ghost Monument" and "Can You Hear Me?"
|-
|rowspan="2"|2019
|His Dark Materials|Charles
|(TV Series), 1 episode: "Lyra's Jordan"
|-
|Dark Ditties Presents: The Witching Hour|Selwyn Parsons
|(TV Movie)
|-
|(in post-production)
|Dark Ditties Presents 'Dad' |Terry Vaughan
|(TV Movie)
|-
|}

Personal life 
Gelder's partner is actor Ben Daniels. They met in 1993 while they were both involved in a production of Entertaining Mr Sloane''.

Notes

External links
 

1949 births
Living people
English male radio actors
English male stage actors
English male television actors
Male actors from London
21st-century English male actors
20th-century English male actors
English gay actors